Repyovka is a rural locality (a selo) and the administrative center of Repyovsky District of Voronezh Oblast, Russia. Population:

References

Notes

Sources

Rural localities in Repyovsky District